The Norm Goss Memorial Medal is awarded to the player judged to be the best afield in the Victorian Football League grand final.

It is named after former player and administrator Norm Goss Sr.

When the competition was split into two divisions before 1989, it was only awarded for the first division grand final.

Voting and presentation 
As at 2022, the winner is voted on by a four-member panel consisting of former players, journalists and media personalities, with one member designated as the chair. Each panellist independently awards 3 votes, 2 votes and 1 vote to the players they regard as the best, second best and third best in the match respectively. These votes are tallied, and the highest number of combined votes wins the medal.

There is no chance of a tie for the medal; if two players are tied for votes, the following countbacks will apply in order:

the player with the higher number of three-votes;
the player with the higher number of two-votes;
the player deemed best by the panel chair.

Recipients

References

External links
Official website of the Victorian Football League (SportingPulse)

Australian rules football awards
Victorian Football League